GPC Biotech (also referred to as GPCbiotech and GPC-Biotech) was a German biopharmaceutical company.  The company's mission statement reads "... to discover, develop and commercialize new anticancer drugs."

Founded in 1997, the company was held privately until May 2000 when an initial public offering was made on the now defunct German Neuer Markt. Subsequent to the closing of the Neuer, GPC refinanced in June 2004 through a public stock offering and listed ADRs on NASDAQ.

In March 2000, the company acquired Mitotix, a United States biotechnology firm located in Cambridge, Massachusetts.  This acquisition has led to the company having ~50% of its employees based in the United States and the remaining 50% in Germany.  Further, the acquisition of Mitotix provided convenient proximity to GPC's long term and continuing collaboration with ALTANA Pharma AG and the ALTANA Research Institute, located in Waltham, Massachusetts.

In November 2009, Agennix AG acquired GPC Biotech .

In 2013 Agennix AG went into liquidation.

Products
As of July 2005, the company does not have a marketed product, though it has three therapeutics in its drug discovery pipeline as shown in the table below.

Notes
  Mission statement obtained from http://www.gpc-biotech.com/en/about_the_company/index.html. Retrieved July 9, 2005.
 A portion of basic corporate information was obtained from the Hoover's Online Fact Sheet for GPC Biotech AG.  Retrieved July 9, 2005.
 reference: Annual Report for the year 2000. Retrieved July 11, 2005.
 reference: Annual Report for the year 2004. Retrieved July 11, 2005.

Companies listed on the Frankfurt Stock Exchange
Biotechnology companies of Germany
Biotechnology companies established in 1997
Biotechnology companies disestablished in 2013
Defunct companies of Germany
German companies established in 1997
German companies disestablished in 2013